Phauda mahisa is a species of moth in the Phaudidae family. It is found on Java in Indonesia.

References

Moths described in 1858
Phaudinae